La Châtre is a commune in the Indre department in central France.

Population

Personalities
It was the birthplace of Henri de Latouche and Emile Acollas. André Boillot the auto racing driver crashed here in 1932 and died from his injuries.
George Sand lived for most of her life at Nohant-Vic near La Châtre.
From 1938 to his death in 1953, Jean de Boschère lived in La Châtre with his companion Elizabeth d'Ennetières.

See also
Saint-Benoît-du-Sault
Communes of the Indre department

References

Communes of Indre
Subprefectures in France
Berry, France